Alexis Louder is an American actress from Charlotte, North Carolina. She is known for 2021's The Tomorrow War and Copshop.

Career
Louder graduated from the University of North Carolina at Charlotte's College of Arts + Architecture in 2013.

She guest starred as Lisina in the 5th season of The Originals, and 
in Watchmen as Ruth Williams, the late mother of Hooded Justice and great-grandmother of Sister Night.

Louder played Nicole Deptul in Amazon Prime Video's The Terminal List.

Cary Darling of the Houston Chronicle and Michael O'Sullivan of the Washington Post singled out Louder's performance in Copshop as "show-stealing" and "compelling".

Filmography

Film

Television

References

External links
 
 

1996 births
University of North Carolina at Charlotte alumni
Actresses from Charlotte, North Carolina
Living people
21st-century American actresses